Pudur is a village in Vikarabad district of the Indian state of Telangana. It is located in Pudur mandal of Vikarabad revenue division.

Election Information
Sarpanch Election Results in 1994-1999 - NallaBapani NarsimhaReddy (TDP)
Sarpanch Election Results in 2000-2005 - Singarenibai Sugunamma (TDP)
Sarpanch Election Results in 2006-2011 - NallaBapani NarsimhaReddy (TDP)
Sarpanch Election Results in 2013 - Kola Sravanthi Venkatesh (INC)

References

Villages in Vikarabad district
Mandal headquarters in Vikarabad district